Hugh McMahon (7 July 1906 – 20 December 1997) was a Scottish footballer who played in the Football League for Blackpool, Doncaster Rovers, Stoke City and Wrexham.

Career
Saltcoats-born McMahon made his debut for Harry Evans's Blackpool in the opening League game of the 1930–31 campaign, a 4–1 defeat at Arsenal on 30 August. He went on to appear in a further 25 games, scoring once – in a 2–1 Christmas Day victory over Sheffield United at Bloomfield Road. Twelve days earlier, he was at centre-half when Blackpool lost 10–1 to Huddersfield Town, but he escaped much of the criticism. "Hugh McMahon played stubbornly and one had the impression in the first half, even if a lot of the old faults appeared again, that his presence in the middle of the half-back line had given some measure of stability to the defence," commented one report on the game. Another stated that the defeat could have been heavier had it not been for the performance of Blackpool's goalkeeper, Horace Pearson.

McMahon joined Stoke City in 1931 and scored on his debut in a 2–1 win at home to Chesterfield at the start of the 1931–32 season. He played the first six matches of the season for Stoke before Arthur Turner returned from injury and McMahon dropped out of the side. He made two more appearances before being allowed to join Wrexham in 1932. He spent three years with the Welsh club making almost 150 league appearances. He went on to play for Workington, Doncaster Rovers and Albion Rovers.

Career statistics
Source:

A.  The "Other" column constitutes appearances and goals in the Football League Third Division North Cup.

References

Scottish footballers
Blackpool F.C. players
Doncaster Rovers F.C. players
Stoke City F.C. players
Wrexham A.F.C. players
English Football League players
1906 births
1997 deaths
Saltcoats Victoria F.C. players
Albion Rovers F.C. players
Workington A.F.C. players
Cowdenbeath F.C. players
Association football defenders
Footballers from North Ayrshire
People from Saltcoats